The 2019–20 New York Islanders season was the 48th season in the franchise's history. It was their fifth season in the Barclays Center in the New York City borough of Brooklyn, which they moved into after leaving Nassau Coliseum in Nassau County on Long Island at the conclusion of the 2014–15 season. During the regular season, the Islanders were scheduled to play 21 home games at Nassau Coliseum but on September 23 moved seven more games from the Barclays Center, making it a total of 28 games to be played at Nassau Coliseum. On February 29, 2020, it was announced that the Islanders would play their last game at Barclays Center on March 22, and then would move to Nassau Coliseum permanently.

The season was suspended by the league officials on March 12, 2020, after several other professional and collegiate sports organizations followed suit as a result of the ongoing COVID-19 pandemic. On May 26, the NHL regular season was officially declared over with the remaining games being cancelled. The Islanders advanced from the Qualifying Round where they defeated the Florida Panthers in four games. They would then defeat the Washington Capitals in five games in the First Round. They faced off against the Philadelphia Flyers in the Second Round, defeating them in seven games and advanced to the Conference Finals for the first time since 1993. However, the Islanders went on to lose to the Tampa Bay Lightning in six games, ending their playoff run. The Islanders set a franchise record for most games played (22) in the postseason.

Standings

Divisional standings

Conference standings

Schedule and results

Preseason
The preseason schedule was published on June 18, 2019.

Regular season
The regular season schedule was released on June 25, 2019. On September 23, the Islanders revised their schedule and moved seven games from Barclays Center to Nassau Coliseum.

Playoffs

The Islanders faced the Florida Panthers in the Qualifying Round, defeating them in four games.

The Islanders faced the Washington Capitals in the First Round, defeating them in five games.

The Islanders faced the Philadelphia Flyers in the Second Round, defeating them in seven games, and advanced to the Conference Finals for the first time since 1993.

The Islanders faced the Tampa Bay Lightning in the Conference Finals, where they lost in six games.

Player statistics
As of September 17, 2020

Skaters

Goaltenders

Transactions
The Islanders have been involved in the following transactions during the 2019–20 season.

Trades

Free agents

Retirement

Signings

Draft picks

Below are the New York Islanders' selections at the 2019 NHL Entry Draft, which was held on June 21 and 22, 2019, at Rogers Arena in Vancouver, British Columbia.

Notes:
 The Calgary Flames' second-round pick went to the New York Islanders as the result of a trade on June 24, 2017, that sent Travis Hamonic and a conditional fourth-round pick in 2019 to Calgary in exchange for a first and second-round pick in 2018 and this pick (being conditional at the time of the trade).

References

New York Islanders seasons
New York Islanders
New York Islanders
New York Islanders
New York Islanders
21st century in Brooklyn
Prospect Heights, Brooklyn